The Chin National Army (abbreviated CNA) is a Chin ethnic armed organisation in Myanmar (Burma). It is the armed wing of the Chin National Front (CNF), and was founded on 20 March 1988 alongside it. The CNA signed a ceasefire agreement with the government of Myanmar on 6 January 2012.

The CNA is a member of the United Nationalities Federal Council, a coalition of opposition groups whose goal is to establish a federal system in Myanmar, or achieve levels of autonomy and peace amongst the various ethnic minorities in the country.

References

Rebel groups in Myanmar
Paramilitary organisations based in Myanmar